İbrahim Büyükak (born 20 August 1983) is a Turkish screenwriter, columnist, director, and actor.

His father was bongo drummer of  Beyaz Kelebekler band. His sister was a violinist. His paternal family is of Turkish descent who immigrated from Bulgaria. His maternal family immigrated from Macedonia. 
 He is a graduate of Uludağ University with a degree in economic studies. He and Oğuzhan Koç played in Bursaspor Young Football Team.

He worked as a columnist for Bursa's Olay newspaper and then contributed to Gırgır, Leman, Lemanyak and Atom magazines. He still writes in Kafa magazine. He is also a member of the BKM (Beşiktaş Culture Center).

In 2008, he joined scenario group of Zeynep Koçak, Oğuzhan Koç, Eser Yenenler and works as screenwriter for years. He started to play some roles in the script. He and Zeynep Koçak wrote the movie Küçük Esnaf together and also starred. The talk show "3 Adam" came to an end in 2017, he started to pursue a solo career and has served as a screenwriter for comedy movies Yol Arkadaşım, in which he also starred. The movie sold 22.6 million in Turkey. He continued to write films "Yol Arkadaşım 2", "Bayi Toplantısı" and series "İlginç Bazı Olaylar".Also, he is director of "İlginç Bazı Olaylar".

Filmography

References

External links 
 
 

Turkish male film actors
Turkish male television actors
1983 births
Male actors from Istanbul
Bursa Uludağ University alumni
Turkish television presenters
Turkish male screenwriters
21st-century Turkish screenwriters
Living people
Turkish people of Bulgarian descent
Turkish people of Macedonian descent